El Pozo is a small town located about 20 minutes northeast of Culiacán, Sinaloa, Mexico. The name of the town means "The Well" in the Spanish language. The town was founded after the end of the Mexican Revolution of 1910. The population of the town is about 700 people, the town has been losing population since 2006 because of migration to urban centers and the United States as a result of violence and lack of job opportunities.

In the town there are 359 men and 363 women. The ratio of women to men is 1,011, and the fertility rate is 3.94 children per woman. Of the total population, 6.09% comes from outside the State of Sinaloa. 8.59% of the population is illiterate (10.58% of men and 6.61% of women). The level of education is 5.69 (5.44 in men and 5.94 in women).

26.73% of the population over 12 years old is employed (44.01% of men and 9.64% of women).

El Pozo is located in the Culiacán Municipality of the State of Sinaloa, Mexico and is in the GPS coordinates: Length (dec): -107.251667 Latitude (dec): 24.911667 The locations medium height over sealevel is 140 meters.

Social structure
A legal claim on health care and social insurance benefits have 509 citizens of El Pozo.

Economic situation
In El Pozo exist about 183 households.

Of these households 186 are common houses or apartments, 64 are without floor and about 14 consist of one room only.

155 of the normal households have sanitary installations, 151 are connected to the public water supply, 175 have access to electricity.

The economic situation allows 2 households to own a computer, 100 own a washing machine and 164 households are equipped with one ore more televisions.

Weblinks 
 about El Pozo 
  Maps
 Fotografias de El Pozo
 El Pozo - Sinaloa 
 Maps
 Pozo

Populated places in Sinaloa